Agonopterix comitella is a moth of the family Depressariidae. It is found in Bulgaria, Greece and Turkey and on Crete. It has also been recorded from Israel, Syria and Turkey.

References

External links
lepiforum.de

Moths described in 1855
Agonopterix
Moths of Europe
Moths of Asia